Tangi is a Breton given name and surname for men. It may refer to:

Tangi, Odisha, a town in India
Tangi, Iran, a place in Sistan and Baluchestan Province, Iran
Tangi, Pakistan
Tangi Tehsil, Pakistan, whose seat is Tangi
Land Rover Tangi, an armoured vehicle used in Northern Ireland
Tangihanga, a Māori funeral rite

See also
 Tanguy (disambiguation), the French spelling of Tangi